The Blackshear Depot, at 200 S. Central Ave. in Blackshear in Pierce County, Georgia, was built in 1917 by the Savannah, Florida & Western Railway  It was used for passenger service into the 1950s and freight service into the 1970s.  It is adjacent to the city hall and city park.  It was listed on the National Register of Historic Places in 2000.

It is a one-story brick building with long rectangular form typical of depots in Georgia.  It has a wide-eaved hipped roof over the main portion of the building, which held passenger waiting rooms and offices.  It has a gabled-end roof over the long freight warehouse section of the building.

References

Railway stations on the National Register of Historic Places in Georgia (U.S. state)
Railway stations in the United States opened in 1917
National Register of Historic Places in Pierce County, Georgia
Former Atlantic Coast Line Railroad stations
Former railway stations in Georgia (U.S. state)